Psalm 78 is the 78th psalm of the Book of Psalms, beginning in English in the King James Version: "Give ear, O my people, to my law". In the slightly different numbering system used in the Greek Septuagint and Latin Vulgate translations of the Bible, this psalm is Psalm 77. In Latin, it is known as "Adtendite populus meus legem meam". It is one of the 12 Psalms of Asaph and is described as a "maskil"  or "contemplation". It is the second-longest Psalm, with 72 verses (Psalm 119 has 176 verses), and the first of the three great history psalms (the others being Psalms 105 and 106). The New American Bible, Revised Edition entitles it "a new beginning in Zion and David".

The psalm forms a regular part of Jewish, Catholic, Lutheran, Anglican and other Protestant liturgies. It has been set to music.

Text

King James Version 
 Give ear, O my people, to my law: incline your ears to the words of my mouth.
 I will open my mouth in a parable: I will utter dark sayings of old:
 Which we have heard and known, and our fathers have told us.
 We will not hide them from their children, shewing to the generation to come the praises of the LORD, and his strength, and his wonderful works that he hath done.
 For he established a testimony in Jacob, and appointed a law in Israel, which he commanded our fathers, that they should make them known to their children:
 That the generation to come might know them, even the children which should be born; who should arise and declare them to their children:
 That they might set their hope in God, and not forget the works of God, but keep his commandments:
 And might not be as their fathers, a stubborn and rebellious generation; a generation that set not their heart aright, and whose spirit was not stedfast with God.
 The children of Ephraim, being armed, and carrying bows, turned back in the day of battle.
 They kept not the covenant of God, and refused to walk in his law;
 And forgat his works, and his wonders that he had shewed them.
 Marvellous things did he in the sight of their fathers, in the land of Egypt, in the field of Zoan.
 He divided the sea, and caused them to pass through; and he made the waters to stand as an heap.
 In the daytime also he led them with a cloud, and all the night with a light of fire.
 He clave the rocks in the wilderness, and gave them drink as out of the great depths.
 He brought streams also out of the rock, and caused waters to run down like rivers.
 And they sinned yet more against him by provoking the most High in the wilderness.
 And they tempted God in their heart by asking meat for their lust.
 Yea, they spake against God; they said, Can God furnish a table in the wilderness?
 Behold, he smote the rock, that the waters gushed out, and the streams overflowed; can he give bread also? can he provide flesh for his people?
 Therefore the LORD heard this, and was wroth: so a fire was kindled against Jacob, and anger also came up against Israel;
 Because they believed not in God, and trusted not in his salvation:
 Though he had commanded the clouds from above, and opened the doors of heaven,
 And had rained down manna upon them to eat, and had given them of the corn of heaven.
 Man did eat angels' food: he sent them meat to the full.
 He caused an east wind to blow in the heaven: and by his power he brought in the south wind.
 He rained flesh also upon them as dust, and feathered fowls like as the sand of the sea:
 And he let it fall in the midst of their camp, round about their habitations.
 So they did eat, and were well filled: for he gave them their own desire;
 They were not estranged from their lust. But while their meat was yet in their mouths,
 The wrath of God came upon them, and slew the fattest of them, and smote down the chosen men of Israel.
 For all this they sinned still, and believed not for his wondrous works.
 Therefore their days did he consume in vanity, and their years in trouble.
 When he slew them, then they sought him: and they returned and enquired early after God.
 And they remembered that God was their rock, and the high God their redeemer.
 Nevertheless they did flatter him with their mouth, and they lied unto him with their tongues.
 For their heart was not right with him, neither were they stedfast in his covenant.
 But he, being full of compassion, forgave their iniquity, and destroyed them not: yea, many a time turned he his anger away, and did not stir up all his wrath.
 For he remembered that they were but flesh; a wind that passeth away, and cometh not again.
 How oft did they provoke him in the wilderness, and grieve him in the desert!
 Yea, they turned back and tempted God, and limited the Holy One of Israel.
 They remembered not his hand, nor the day when he delivered them from the enemy.
 How he had wrought his signs in Egypt, and his wonders in the field of Zoan.
 And had turned their rivers into blood; and their floods, that they could not drink.
 He sent divers sorts of flies among them, which devoured them; and frogs, which destroyed them.
 He gave also their increase unto the caterpiller, and their labour unto the locust.
 He destroyed their vines with hail, and their sycomore trees with frost.
 He gave up their cattle also to the hail, and their flocks to hot thunderbolts.
 He cast upon them the fierceness of his anger, wrath, and indignation, and trouble, by sending evil angels among them.
 He made a way to his anger; he spared not their soul from death, but gave their life over to the pestilence;
 And smote all the firstborn in Egypt; the chief of their strength in the tabernacles of Ham:
 But made his own people to go forth like sheep, and guided them in the wilderness like a flock.
 And he led them on safely, so that they feared not: but the sea overwhelmed their enemies.
 And he brought them to the border of his sanctuary, even to this mountain, which his right hand had purchased.
 He cast out the heathen also before them, and divided them an inheritance by line, and made the tribes of Israel to dwell in their tents.
 Yet they tempted and provoked the most high God, and kept not his testimonies:
 But turned back, and dealt unfaithfully like their fathers: they were turned aside like a deceitful bow.
 For they provoked him to anger with their high places, and moved him to jealousy with their graven images.
 When God heard this, he was wroth, and greatly abhorred Israel:
 So that he forsook the tabernacle of Shiloh, the tent which he placed among men;
 And delivered his strength into captivity, and his glory into the enemy's hand.
 He gave his people over also unto the sword; and was wroth with his inheritance.
 The fire consumed their young men; and their maidens were not given to marriage.
 Their priests fell by the sword; and their widows made no lamentation.
 Then the LORD awaked as one out of sleep, and like a mighty man that shouteth by reason of wine.
 And he smote his enemies in the hinder parts: he put them to a perpetual reproach.
 Moreover he refused the tabernacle of Joseph, and chose not the tribe of Ephraim:
 But chose the tribe of Judah, the mount Zion which he loved.
 And he built his sanctuary like high palaces, like the earth which he hath established for ever.
 He chose David also his servant, and took him from the sheepfolds:
 From following the ewes great with young he brought him to feed Jacob his people, and Israel his inheritance.
 So he fed them according to the integrity of his heart; and guided them by the skilfulness of his hands.

Uses

Judaism 
This psalm is recited on the third through sixth days of Passover in some traditions.
Verse 36-37 are found in the Foundation of Repentance recited on the eve of Rosh Hashanah.
Verse 38 (V'hu Rachum) is the first verse of a paragraph by the same name in Pesukei Dezimra, is the seventeenth verse of Yehi Kivod in Pesukei Dezimra, is the opening verse of the long Tachanun recited on Mondays and Thursdays, is found in Uva Letzion, and is one of two verses recited at the beginning of Maariv.
Verse 54 is part of Pirkei Avot Chapter 6, no. 10.
Verse 61 is part of the long Tachanun recited on Mondays and Thursdays.

New Testament 
In the New Testament:
 Verse 2 is quoted in Matthew 
 Verse 24 is quoted in John

Book of Common Prayer 
In the Church of England's Book of Common Prayer, this psalm is appointed to be read on the evening of the 15th day of the month.

Musical settings 
Heinrich Schütz set Psalm 78 in a metred version in German, "Hör, mein Volk, mein Gesetz und Weis", SWV 176, as part of the Becker Psalter, first published in 1628.

See also
 The Exodus
 Ipuwer Papyrus
 Passover
 Plagues of Egypt
 Sources and parallels of the Exodus
 Stations of the Exodus
 Related Bible passages: Va'eira, Bo (parsha), and Beshalach: Torah portions (parashot) telling the Exodus story; Psalm 105

References

External links 

 
 
  in Hebrew and English, Mechon-mamre
 Text of Psalm 78 according to the 1928 Psalter
 A maskil of Asaph. Attend, my people, to my teaching; listen to the words of my mouth. (text and footnotes) United States Conference of Catholic Bishops
 Psalm 78 – Learning from God’s Faithfulness to His Rebellious People (text and detailed commentary) enduringword.com
 Psalm 78:1 (introduction and text) Bible study tools
 Psalm 78/ Refrain: O Lord, how glorious are your works. Church of England
 Psalm 78 Bible gateway
 Charles H. Spurgeon: Psalm 78 (commentary) spurgeon.org

078